Andrei Kavalenka (born 9 March 1955 in Körmend, Hungary) is a trap shooter competing for Belarus. He competed in the trap event at the 2012 Summer Olympics and placed 34th and last in the qualification round.

References

1955 births
Living people
Hungarian male sport shooters
Belarusian male sport shooters
Olympic shooters of Belarus
Shooters at the 2012 Summer Olympics
People from Körmend
Sportspeople from Vas County